Inger-Maria Mahlke (born 1977 in Hamburg, Germany) is a German author. In 2018 she was the recipient of the German Book Prize.

Life 
Mahlke grew up in Lübeck, Schleswig-Holstein, northern Germany. She studied Law at the Free University of Berlin, where she worked in the department of Criminology. She lives in Berlin.

Writing career 
In 2009 she won the Open Mike award,  an international German-language literary prize established in 1993 for new writers. Her first novel was Silberfischchen (Silverfish) published in 2010, for which she was awarded the inaugural Klaus-Michael Kühne Prize of the Hamburg Harbour Front Literaturfestival, an award for debut novelists established in the same year.

In 2012 she was awarded the Ernst Willner Prize of the Festival of German-Language Literature. Other awards followed including a shortlisting for the 2015 German Book Prize for her novel Wie Ihr wollt. In 2018 she was awarded the German Book Prize for her novel, Archipel.

Mahlke is a member of the PEN Centre Germany.

Works

Literature 

 Takis Würger: Überzeugungstäterin. Besuch bei der Schriftstellerin Inger-Maria Mahlke. In: Der Spiegel. No. 39/2018, pp. 126f.

References 

1977 births
21st-century German novelists
German women novelists
Living people
German Book Prize winners
Writers from Schleswig-Holstein
21st-century German women writers